Eben Dyer Jordan Sr. (October 13, 1822 − November 15, 1895) was an American business executive, best remembered as the co-founder of the department store chain Jordan, Marsh & Co. with Benjamin L. Marsh in 1841.

Early life
Jordan was born in Danville, Maine on October 13, 1822. He was a son of Benjamin and Lydia (née Wright) Jordan and, through his father, was directly descended from the Rev. Robert Jordan, a clergyman of the Church of England who came to America and settled in what is now the state of Maine in about the year 1640.

After his father died young, leaving his mother in charge of several children, Jordan was sent to live with a neighbor on their farm where he learned to farm, saving up enough money to leave Portland and move to Boston at age fourteen.

Career
Jordan clerked for two years in the dry goods store of William P. Tenney & Co. before working for another merchant named Pratt. At age nineteen, one of Boston's leading merchants, Joshua Stetson, "appreciated his ability, and offered to assist him in starting business on his own account." At twenty-five he sold his thriving store and went to work for J. M. Beebe, who taught him "not only a practical knowledge of the principles, methods, and in the management of a great business enterprise, but of the system which Mr. Beebe had perfected only after twenty-five years of close and assiduous labor and study."

In addition to co-founding the department store chain Jordan Marsh with Benjamin L. Marsh in 1841, Jordan led a group of businessmen in founding The Boston Globe in 1872.

Personal life
On January 13, 1847, he married Julia M. Clark (1825–1897), a daughter of James and Elizabeth (née Raymond) Clark. They had five children:

 Walter Jordan (1848–1854), who died young.
 James Clark Jordan (1850–1910), who married Helen L. Stevens and Jeannette Amanda Stiles; he developed Jordan Park in San Francisco.
 Julia Maria Jordan (b. 1852), who married Herbert Dumaresq in 1873; he was a cotton manufacturer and who later became a partner in Jordan, Marsh & Company.
 Eben Dyer Jordan Jr. (1857–1916), who married May Sheppard (1861–1920), a daughter of Joseph Buzby Sheppard, in 1883.
 Alice Jordan (1863–1935), who married the Rev. Arthur Wellesley Foster in 1885; as a wedding present Jordan gifted them Brockhampton Court, near Fownhope in Herefordshire, England.

Jordan died on November 15, 1895 at his residence on Beacon Street in Boston. The Eben Jordan House is located on 46 Beacon Street in Beacon Hill, Boston. In 2000, a petition to grant landmark status to the interior was submitted to the Boston Landmarks Commission; as of 2022, the request is still under study.

Descendants
Through his son Eben Jr., he was a grandfather of Robert Jordan (1884–1932) and Dorothy Jordan (d. 1976), who married Monroe Douglas Robinson (1887–1944), a son of Corinne Roosevelt Robinson and Douglas Robinson Jr. and grandson of Douglas Robinson Sr. and Theodore Roosevelt Sr. Robinson was a nephew of U.S. President Theodore Roosevelt and a first cousin of First Lady Eleanor Roosevelt.

References

External links

1822 births
1895 deaths
American businesspeople in retailing
Businesspeople from Maine
Businesspeople from Boston
People from Auburn, Maine
American people of English descent
19th-century American businesspeople
The Boston Globe people